Aušra Šponė (born 6 June 2001) is a Lithuanian handball player who plays for Eglė Vilnius and the Lithuania national handball team.

In 2019 Aušra was awarded Lithuanian female handball player of the year award.

References

External links
Info

2001 births
Lithuanian female handball players
Sportspeople from Vilnius
Living people